Léonie Marie Julie Bathiat (15 May 1898 – 23 July 1992), known professionally as Arletty, was a French actress, singer, and fashion model. As an actress she is particularly known for classics directed by Marcel Carné, including Hotel du Nord (1938), Le jour se lève (1939) and Children of Paradise (1945). She was found guilty of treason for an affair with a German officer during World War II.

Early years
Arletty was born in Courbevoie (near Paris), to a working-class family. After her father's death, she left home and pursued a modeling career. She took the stage name "Arlette" based on the heroine of a story by Guy de Maupassant. She was not interested in acting until she met Paul Guillaume, an art dealer. He recommended some theaters and, at the age of 21, she was hired.

Her early career was dominated by the music hall, and she later appeared in plays and cabaret. Arletty was a stage performer for ten years before her film debut in 1930. Arletty's career took off around 1936 when she appeared as the leading lady in the stage plays Les Joies du Capitole and Fric-Frac, in which she starred opposite Michel Simon. She later starred as Blanche in the French version of A Streetcar Named Desire.

Marcel Carné was known for his poetic realism filmmaking style. Arletty's minor role of Raymonde in his film, Hotel du Nord, garnered attention for her "Atmosphere! Atmosphere!” performance. In 1945 Arletty appeared in her most famous film role, the central part of Garance in Les Enfants du Paradis, her fourth role for the director. For this role she earned one of the highest salaries ever in French cinema.

Collaboration
Arletty was imprisoned in 1945 for her wartime liaison with a German Luftwaffe officer, Hans-Jürgen Soehring (1908-1960), during the occupation of France. She allegedly later commented on the experience, "My heart is French but my ass is international." The quotation in French is "Si mon cœur est français, mon cul, lui, est international" and the word "cul" is also translated as "sex." Although other French women fell in love with German soldiers, her romantic affiliation with Soehring during the German occupation prompted a charge of treason.

James Lord wrote of her special treatment:

Arletty was too well known for the mere humiliation of having her head shaved, her naked skull tarred with a swastika and in this abject state paraded through the streets to confront the jeers and spittle of the mob. Prison would be none too good for her, people said, looking forward to severe retribution for the moral treason of which they found her guilty.
For her crimes she received a sentence of eighteen months imprisonment, most of which was served in a private chateau.

Later years
After a moderately successful period as a stage actress in later life she was forced to retire into private life due to progressive loss of her eyesight. One of her final screen appearances was in a small role as an elderly French woman in The Longest Day (1962).

After her death in 1992, Arletty was cremated, and her ashes interred in her hometown at the Nouveau Cimetière de Courbevoie.

Legacy
In 1995 the government of France issued a series of limited edition coins to commemorate the centenary of film that included a 100 Franc coin bearing the image of Arletty.

Filmography

 The Sweetness of Loving (1930) as Une dactylo 
 Un chien qui rapporte (1932) as Josyane Plaisir
 The Beautiful Adventure (1932) as Madame Desmignières
 Abduct Me (1932) as Lulu
 Mademoiselle Josette, My Woman (1933) as Unknown role
 Je te confie ma femme (1933) as Totoche
 Une idée folle (1933) as Anita - une danseuse
 Un soir de réveillon (1933) as Viviane
 Court Waltzes (1933) as La chocolatière
 Le voyage de Monsieur Perrichon (1934) as Anita Mathieu
 Pension Mimosas (1935) as La môme Parasol
Le Vertige (1935) as Emma
 Madame Angot's Daughter (1935) as Ducoudray
 Amants et Voleurs (1935) as Agathe
La Garçonne (1936) as Niquette
 Adventure in Paris (1936) as Rose Blondel de Saint-Leu
 The Bureaucrats (1936) as La belle-soeur de la hourmerie
 Le Mari rêvé (1936) as Eve Roland
 Let's Make a Dream (1936) as Une invitée (prologue)
 Mais n'te promène donc pas toute nue (1936) as Clarisse
 Feu la mère de madame (1936) as Yvonne
 The Pearls of the Crown (1937) as La reine d'Abyssinie
 Désiré (1937) as Madeleine Crapicheau, la femme de chambre
 Aloha, le chant des îles (1937) as Ginette Gina
 Mirages (1938) as Arlette
 The Little Thing (1938) as Irma Borel
 Mother Love (1938) as Bernadette Mezin
 Hôtel du Nord (1938) as Raymonde
 Daybreak (1939) as Clara
 Fric-Frac (1939) as Loulou
 Extenuating Circumstances (1939) as Marie Qu'a-d'ça
 Thunder Over Paris (1940) as Ida
 Madame Sans-Gêne (1941) as Catherine Hubscher
La Femme que j'ai le plus aimée (1942) as Simone, l'actrice locataire
 Bolero (1942) as Catherine
 L'Amant de Bornéo (1942) as Stella Losange
 Les Visiteurs du soir (1942) as Dominique
 Children of Paradise (1945) as Claire Reine, dite Garance
 Madame et ses peaux-rouges (1948) as Mademoiselle Pascale
 Portrait d'un assassin (1949) as Martha
 Gibier de potence (1951) as Madame Alice
L'Amour, Madame (1952) as Herself
 The Father of the Girl (1953) as Edith Mars
 Flesh and the Woman (1954) Blanche
 The Air of Paris (1954) Blanche Le Garrec
 Huis clos (1954) as Inès, une lesbienne
Mon curé chez les pauvres (1956) as Nine
 Vacances explosives (1957) as Arlette Bernard
 The Stowaway (1958) as Gabrielle
 And Your Sister? (1958) as Lucrèce du Boccage
 Sunday Encounter (1958) as Juliette Armier
 Maxime (1958) as Gazelle
 Paris la belle (1960, short) as Récitante / Narrator (voice)
 Les Primitifs du XIIIe (1960, short) as Récitante / Narrator (voice)
 The Dance (1962) as La mère d'Albert
 Girl on the Road (1962) as Gabrielle, maîtresse de Rameau
 The Law of Men (1962) as Loune de Lindt
 The Longest Day (1962) as Madame Barrault
 Destination Rome (1962) as  La marquise
 The Trip to Biarritz (1963) as Fernande
 Dina chez les rois (1967) as Récitante / Narrator (voice)
 Jacques Prévert (1977) as Herself
Carné, l'homme à la caméra (1985) as Herself (voice)

References

Further reading

External links

 
 
 
 
 
 Arletty at filmsdefrance.com
 Interview d'Arletty avec Marcel Carné (Paris Match 1992) 
 Arletty esoteric biography via 4dbios  
 bibliography
  Eine Liebe in Zeiten des Krieges. Die Zeit, No. 32, 2009

1898 births
1992 deaths
People from Courbevoie
French film actresses
French stage actresses
French blind people
20th-century French actresses
20th-century French women singers